"Brick House" is a song from the Commodores' 1977 self-titled album (released as Zoom in the UK). The single peaked at number 5 in the U.S. and number 32 in the UK Singles Chart.

Background
Lionel Richie stated that the song's title is a play on the expression "built like a brick shithouse," referring to a strongly built woman.

Record World said that the tempo is speeded up from the previous single "Easy" to "moderate funk."

Charts

References

External links
 List of cover versions of "Brick House" at SecondHandSongs.com

1977 songs
1977 singles
Commodores songs
Songs written by Lionel Richie
Song recordings produced by James Anthony Carmichael
Motown singles